The Railroads' War Board was a committee of US railroad executives, created voluntarily by the railroad industry in early 1917, in an attempt to improve railroad operations as the United States entered World War I.

Following the declaration of war by the United States on April 6, 1917,
a large meeting of railroad executives was convened in Washington, D.C. to discuss supporting the war effort. The American Railway Association authorized creation of the war board. The board comprised five members, chaired by Fairfax Harrison, president of the Southern Railway. The additional members were:
 Howard Elliott, chairman, Northern Pacific Railway
 Hale Holden, president, Chicago, Burlington & Quincy Railroad
 Julius Kruttschnitt, chairman, Southern Pacific Railway
 Samuel Rea, president, Pennsylvania Railroad.
There were also two ex officio members who participated in board discussions and policies: Daniel Willard, President, Baltimore and Ohio Railroad (liaison with the recently formed Council of National Defense); and Edgar E. Clark, Commissioner, Interstate Commerce Commission (which was itself closely studying the national railroad problems).

The board had limited success and in late 1917 supported the decision by President Woodrow Wilson to nationalize the railroads to support the war effort. Wilson established the United States Railroad Administration, to nationalize the railroads, on December 26, 1917.

References 

American railroad executives
History of rail transportation in the United States
United States home front during World War I